Anthony "Anto" Thistlethwaite (born 31 August 1955, Lutterworth, Leicestershire, England) is a British multi-instrumentalist best known as a founding member (with guitarist Mike Scott) of the folk rock group, The Waterboys and later as a long-standing member of Irish rock band The Saw Doctors.

Career
After a year busking in Paris, playing tenor saxophone around the streets of the Latin Quarter, in 1980 Thistlethwaite moved to London and in 1981 he played saxophone on Robyn Hitchcock's Groovy Decay album as well as Nikki Sudden's Waiting on Egypt. Mike Scott heard the saxophone solo on Nikki's "Johnny Smiled Slowly" and invited Thistlethwaite to come and play with his fledgling band "The Red and The Black". Their first record together "A Girl Called Johnny" was to be released as The Waterboys' first single in March 1983 and featured Thistlethwaite on tenor sax.

Although Thistlethwaite is mainly known as a saxophonist he has also featured heavily on mandolin, plus harmonica, Hammond organ, guitar and bass with The Waterboys and other acts. During the 1980s and 90s he also featured on recordings by: World Party, Fairground Attraction, Psychedelic Furs, Bob Dylan, China Crisis, Johnny Thunders, Donovan, The Vibrators, Chris De Burgh, Bruce Foxton (The Jam), The Mission, and others as a session musician.

During the 1990s he released three solo albums which included contributions from the likes of: Kirsty MacColl, Eddi Reader and Ralph McTell as well as many musicians including ('Rolling Stones' guitarist) Mick Taylor and Sonny Landreth. His third album Crawfish and Caviar consisted of songs recorded in St Petersburg, Russia and Louisiana, US. For the past twelve years Thistlethwaite has been a full-time member of The Saw Doctors from County Galway, Republic of Ireland.

Sharon Shannon, also a member of The Waterboys, recorded a song that she named "Anto's Cajun Cousins", after his American Thistlethwaite relatives, on her eponymous debut album.

Discography
Thistlethwaite has released five solo albums:

Aesop Wrote a Fable (1993)
Cartwheels (1995)
Crawfish and Caviar (1997)
Back to The Land. The Best of... (2002)
Stinky Fingers (2011) with Mick Taylor

References

External links

1955 births
Living people
The Waterboys members
English rock musicians
English rock saxophonists
British male saxophonists
People from Lutterworth
People educated at Lutterworth College
Musicians from Leicestershire
21st-century saxophonists
The Saw Doctors members